Clamensane is a commune in the Alpes-de-Haute-Provence department in southeastern France.

Geography
The village is located 700 m above sea level, at the confluence of Sasse and Vermeil rivers.

Population

See also
Communes of the Alpes-de-Haute-Provence department

References

Michel de La Torre, Alpes-de-Haute-Provence : le guide complet des 200 communes, Paris, Deslogis-Lacoste, coll. « Villes et villages de France », 1989, Relié, 72 p. (non-paginé)

Communes of Alpes-de-Haute-Provence
Alpes-de-Haute-Provence communes articles needing translation from French Wikipedia